Nothobranchius geminus is a species of killifish in the family Nothobranchiidae. It is endemic to Tanzania.  Its natural habitat is intermittent freshwater pools where it feeds on invertebrates at the surface.

References

Links
 Nothobranchius geminus on WildNothos

geminus
Fish of Tanzania
Endemic fauna of Tanzania
Taxonomy articles created by Polbot
Fish described in 2002